Valentina Meredova (née Nazarova; born 29 September 1984) is a Turkmenistani sprinter. She represented Turkmenistan at the 2008 Summer Olympics in Beijing. She competed in the 100 metres and placed sixth in her heat with a time of 11.94 s, without advancing to the second round. She competed in the IAAF World Championships in 2005, 2007 and 2015, never advancing beyond the heats.

Competition record

Personal bests
Outdoor
100 metres – 11.56 (+1.7 m/s, Almaty 2008)
200 metres – 23.77 (+2.0 m/s, Almaty 2008)
Indoor
60 metres – 7.46 (Ashgabat 2017)

References

External links

1984 births
Living people
Sportspeople from Ashgabat
Turkmenistan female sprinters
Athletes (track and field) at the 2006 Asian Games
Athletes (track and field) at the 2008 Summer Olympics
Athletes (track and field) at the 2014 Asian Games
Olympic athletes of Turkmenistan
World Athletics Championships athletes for Turkmenistan
Asian Games competitors for Turkmenistan